Ela (Greek:  Έλα; English: Come) is the title of the fourteenth studio album by Greek singer Peggy Zina, released on 30 November 2018 by Minos EMI in Greece and Cyprus.

Track listing

Music videos
 "Mou Leipeis"
 "O Hronos"
 "Mi M' Akoumpas"

Release history

Charts

References

Greek-language albums
Peggy Zina albums
Minos EMI albums